This is a list of major political scandals in Italy:

 Former Prime Minister Silvio Berlusconi underage prostitution charges
 Lockheed bribery scandals, which caused President Giovanni Leone to resign
 Masonic lodge Propaganda Due scandal, 1980s
 Tangentopoli, diffuse corruption cases in national politics in the early 1990s
 Revelation of Gladio, a NATO anti-communist stay-behind network
 Niger uranium forgeries used by George W. Bush as pretext for the 2003 invasion of Iraq
 SISMI-Telecom scandal, domestic surveillance program
 Bancopoli, bank takeover-merger scandal of 2005, involving insider trading, audiotapes and political influences
 Abu Omar case
 2014 Rome corruption scandal

New findings 
In last years, a successful initiative of moral revolt against political malpractice, entrusted to the Internet as a blog on "the list of parties with no convicted criminals on their electoral lists", has sparked the race to discover criminal records of candidates.

References

See also
 Political alienation
 Apoliticism
 Political apathy
 Protest vote

 
Italy
Scandals